In probability theory and statistics, a complex random vector is typically a tuple of complex-valued random variables, and generally is a random variable taking values in a vector space over the field of complex numbers. If  are complex-valued random variables, then the n-tuple  is a complex random vector. Complex random variables can always be considered as pairs of real random vectors: their real and imaginary parts.

Some concepts of real random vectors have a straightforward generalization to complex random vectors. For example, the definition of the mean of a complex random vector. Other concepts are unique to complex random vectors.

Applications of complex random vectors are found in digital signal processing.

Definition

Cumulative distribution function
The generalization of the cumulative distribution function from real to complex random variables is not obvious because expressions of the form  make no sense. However expressions of the form  make sense. Therefore, the cumulative distribution function  of a random vector  is defined as

where .

Expectation
As in the real case the expectation (also called expected value) of a complex random vector is taken component-wise.

Covariance matrix and pseudo-covariance matrix

The covariance matrix (also called second central moment)  contains the covariances between all pairs of components. The covariance matrix of an  random vector is an  matrix whose th element is the covariance between the i th and the j th random variables. Unlike in the case of real random variables, the covariance between two random variables involves the complex conjugate of one of the two. Thus the covariance matrix is a Hermitian matrix.

The pseudo-covariance matrix (also called relation matrix) is defined replacing Hermitian transposition by transposition in the definition above.

Properties
The covariance matrix is a hermitian matrix, i.e.
.

The pseudo-covariance matrix is a symmetric matrix, i.e.
.

The covariance matrix is a positive semidefinite matrix, i.e.
.

Covariance matrices of real and imaginary parts

By decomposing the random vector  into its real part  and imaginary part  (i.e. ), the pair  has a covariance matrix of the form:

 

Conversely:

Cross-covariance matrix and pseudo-cross-covariance matrix

The cross-covariance matrix between two complex random vectors  is defined as:

And the pseudo-cross-covariance matrix is defined as:

.

Independence

.

Circular symmetry

Properties
 The expectation of a circularly symmetric complex random vector is either zero or it is not defined.
 The pseudo-covariance matrix of a circularly symmetric complex random vector is zero.

Proper complex random vectors

A complex random vector  is called proper if the following three conditions are all satisfied:
  (zero mean)
  (all components have finite variance)
 

Two complex random vectors  are called  jointly proper is the composite random vector  is proper.

Properties
 A complex random vector  is proper if, and only if, for all (deterministic) vectors  the complex random variable  is proper.
 Every circularly symmetric complex random vector with finite variance of all its components is proper.
 There are proper complex random vectors that are not circularly symmetric.
 A real random vector is proper if and only if it is constant.
 Two jointly proper complex random vectors are uncorrelated if and only if their covariace matrix is zero, i.e. if .

Cauchy-Schwarz inequality
The Cauchy-Schwarz inequality for complex random vectors is
.

Characteristic function
The characteristic function of a complex random vector  with  components is a function  defined by:

See also
 Complex normal distribution
 Complex random variable (scalar case)

References

Probability theory
Randomness
Algebra of random variables